Colonel James Dunlop was a Scotland international rugby football player.

Rugby Union career

Amateur career

Dunlop played for West of Scotland.

International career

He was capped once for Scotland on 8 March 1875.

Military career

Dunlop was in the Royal Horse Artillery, entering the army in 1875. He rose through the ranks:- Captain in 1884; Major in 1892; Lieutenant - Colonel in 1900; and finally Colonel in 1904. He took part in the Second Anglo-Afghan War in 1879-80; the Third Anglo-Burmese War in 1886-87; and the Second Boer War in 1901–02.

Family

Dunlop was unmarried.

He was half-brother to Colin Dunlop of Lockerbie House, Dumfriesshire. His father was Colin Robert Dunlop of Fullarton House, Lanarkshire. His mother, Ann Maxwell Black, was a daughter of James Black of Craigmaddie.

His ancestors included John Dunlop of Garnkirk, Cadder who was a burgess of Glasgow in 1631. Dunlop of Garnkirk's brother received a baronetcy, now extinct. Another ancestor was Colin Dunlop of Carmyle, who was Provost of Glasgow in 1770. Dunlop of Carmyle's grandson was Colin Dunlop of Tollcross, M.P. for Glasgow in 1835.

References

1923 deaths
1854 births
Rugby union players from Coatbridge
Scottish rugby union players
Scotland international rugby union players
West of Scotland FC players
Rugby union forwards